Breakin' Point is the seventh album by Peter Bjorn and John. It was released on 10 June 2016. An earlier version of the bonus track "High Up" was released on the Volym 2 compilation album by the label INGRID in 2015.

Track listing

References 

Peter Bjorn and John albums
2016 albums